Black Lips! is the Black Lips' debut LP album, released in 2003. The cover is from the silent movie Les Vampires from 1915.
Tracks 11, 12 and 4 produced, mixed and mastered by Eric Gagnon/Eric El Camino: Bass on Stone Cold by Gagnon.

Track listing 

 "Throw It Away" – 2:33
 "Freakout" – 1:43
 "Ain't No Deal" – 2:25
 "Stone Cold" – 2:02
 "I've Got a Knife" – 1:14
 "Down and Out" – 2:11
 "Steps" – 1:28
 "Fad" – 1:49
 "Sweet Kin" – 2:00
 "Crazy Girl" – 1:52
 "Everybody Loves a Cocksucker" – 3:20
 "Can't Get Me Down" – 2:30
 "You're Dumb" – 3:41
 "'Say Hello to the Postman" – 2:11

References

2003 albums
Black Lips albums